Minipsyrassa guanabarina is a species of beetle in the family Cerambycidae. It was described by Martins and Napp in 1992.

Further reading

References

Elaphidiini
Beetles described in 1992